The Trijicon biblical verses controversy, refers to the stamping of Bible verse references (e.g. "Rev21:23") onto optical sights for rifles manufactured by Trijicon. Such firearms are also known as "Jesus rifles". Users and purchasers of the equipment—which included the United States Army and Marine Corps and military units around the world—were unaware of the inscriptions. Upon discovery of the practice in 2010, controversy erupted across religious and political spectra regarding inappropriate and sacrilegious aspects.

ABC News report 
On 18 January 2010, ABC News reported Trijicon was placing references to verses in the Bible in the serial numbers of sights sold to the United States Armed Forces. (The book chapter:verse cites were appended to the model designation, see photo.) The ABC News story was initiated by Michael L. Weinstein and the Military Religious Freedom Foundation, after being alerted to the practice by multiple sources including active duty military personnel.

Tom Munson, director of sales and marketing for Trijicon, said the practice of including the references was started in 1981 by Glyn Bindon, the company's founder and a devout Christian, who died in a 2003 plane crash.

Responses 
An interfaith organization spoke out against the practice. 

A spokesman for United States Central Command, which manages military operations in Iraq and Afghanistan, opined the inscribed sights do not violate the military's self-imposed ban on proselytizing because there is no effort to distribute the equipment beyond the US troops who use them.

On 20 January 2010, the BBC reported that the British Ministry of Defence, which had—when unaware of the issue—recently purchased 480 Trijicon sights for use in Afghanistan, appreciated that the markings could cause offense, and had taken the matter up with the company.

As news of the inscriptions surfaced, further armed forces became aware of the controversial practice. The New Zealand Special Air Service had purchased 260 of the scopes in 2004 and at the time was also unaware of the practice. The New Zealand SAS confirmed it would not stop using the sights as they are considered the best in the world. A New Zealand defence force spokesman was quoted as saying "We deem them to be inappropriate", and the NZ Prime Minister John Key said the government was not aware of the inscriptions when the equipment was purchased, and "we are in discussions with the company in the United States who will ensure the inscriptions are removed, and we wouldn't want them on future sights".

End of practice for government contracts 
On 22 January 2010, Trijicon announced it would stop the practice of engraving Biblical references on products sold to  the US Army. It also offered to provide modification kits for the purpose of removing such engravings on sights already produced and sold to the military. In a statement, the company said it was both "prudent and appropriate" to remove the engravings. Trijicon's consumer products are still engraved with Biblical references in accordance with company tradition.

Inscriptions 
The Trijicon serial numbers in question were based on verses relating to illumination. The book chapter:verse references are found appended to the model designations.

See also
Religious symbolism in the United States military

References 

Christianity in popular culture controversies
Firearm sights
2010 controversies
Light and religion